Henri Gutierrez (3 February 1883 – 5 May 1955) was a French athlete. He competed in the men's long jump at the 1908 Summer Olympics.

References

External links
 

1883 births
1955 deaths
Athletes (track and field) at the 1908 Summer Olympics
French male long jumpers
Olympic athletes of France
Place of birth missing